ICON Park is an entertainment complex in Orlando, Florida. The complex is on 20 acres and has more than 50 attractions including a 400 foot tall (122m) observation wheel, a Madame Tussaud's Wax Museum, a Sea Life aquarium, as well as bars, restaurants, shops and specialty kiosks.

Attractions

Rides and activities 
In addition to rides, the park features a museum, aquarium, arcade, a "7D" theater and a museum of illusions.

The Wheel at ICON Park is a Ferris wheel standing 400 feet (122m) tall.
Madame Tussaud's Wax Museum Orlando
Orlando Starflyer is a 450 foot tall swing ride.
Sea Life Aquarium Orlando
Museum of Illusions Orlando
In The Game / 7D Motion Theater
Carousel on the Promenade at ICON Park
Pearl Express Train is a locomotive ride around the ICON Park Promenade
Max Action Arena is an entertainment center with virtual reality technology and adventure rooms that was announced in fall 2022.

Shopping
The park features more than 40 specialty retail kiosks around the ICON Park, as well as an original shop featuring park merchandise.

Build-A-Bear Workshop
Sugar Factory 
The Wheelhouse Gift Shop 
Calenoi Sunglasses
ICON Park Gifts
Breathe – A modern Wellness Bar
Currency Exchange International

Restaurants
The park features several notable restaurant chains such as Buffalo Wild Wings, Outback Steakhouse and Shake Shack.

Tin Roof: A Live Music Joint
Blake Shelton's Ole Red
Gordon Ramsay Fish & Chips
Sloppy Joe's Orlando
Sugar Factory
Tapa Toro Spanish Restaurant
Uncle Julio's Mexican
Carrabba's Italian Grill
iCafe de Paris
Haagen-Dazs
The Wheelhouse Market Food Hall
iLounge Istanbul
ICON Park Sky Bar, Lawn Bar, Wheelhouse Bar
Brother Jimmy's
Juan Valdez

Former Attractions 

 The Orlando Free Fall: a 430 foot (131m) tall, free-standing drop tower. Permanently closed in 2022 following an accident, it is standing but slated for future removal.

Incidents and accidents

On March 24, 2022, 14-year-old Tyre Sampson of St. Louis, Missouri, fell to his death from the Orlando Free Fall ride. Owned and operated by The Slingshot Group, the attraction opened as the tallest free-standing drop tower, and operated for less than 3 months prior to the accident. The ride was immediately closed alongside another ride at the park, the Orlando Slingshot, also owned and operated by The Slingshot Group, as the investigation proceeded. Through an investigation and report provided by Quest Engineering and Failure Analysis, Inc., it was discovered that the restraint proximity sensors of the seat Sampson was in had been manually adjusted after they had been initially secured in place by the ride manufacturer. The ride would not operate if the sensors detected that any of the restraints were not sufficiently closed, and this adjustment allowed the restraint to be open almost twice as wide as normal without triggering a shutdown. Consequently, Sampson's restraint left a large enough opening for him to slide out of his seat. On October 6, 2022, ICON Park confirmed the permanent closure and future removal of the ride. The Orlando Slingshot, despite not causing any accidents, has also been permanently closed due to the owners' fear of guilt by association.

A new skill/laser tag game known as Bullseye Blast was closed in July 2022 shortly after its introduction and put into a redesign, as social media users complained after several nationwide mass and school shootings. Centered on The Wheel, the game had players target certain buildings, streetlamps, and parking lots around park property with pre-placed targets using a laser tag-esque gun during a twenty-minute circuit on the wheel.

On December 31, 2022, around 6:20 p.m., Orange County Fire and Rescue received a report of a power failure of The Wheel, stranding 62 people on the ride for over three hours. Several videos emerged of large sparks, smoke, and fire coming off of the side of the wheel, slightly above one of the rides pods. No injuries were reported.

References

External links

Tourist attractions in Orlando, Florida